The men's road race at the 1934 UCI Road World Championships was the eighth edition of the event. The race took place on Saturday 18 August 1934 in Leipzig, Germany. The race was won by Karel Kaers of Belgium.

Final classification

References

Men's Road Race
UCI Road World Championships – Men's road race